She Fell Among Thieves is a 1978 British television film based on the novel of the same name by Dornford Yates, adapted for television by Tom Sharpe. It stars Malcolm McDowell and Eileen Atkins and was directed by Clive Donner. It was first broadcast on BBC2 on Wednesday 1 March 1978 at 9:40 p.m. as “Play of the Week.”

It was one of a series of television films made by the BBC and Donner which focused on British heroes between the wars, others including Rogue Male and The Three Hostages.

Cast

 Richard Chandos - Malcolm McDowell
 Vanity Fair - Eileen Atkins
 Jonathan Mansel - Michael Jayston
 Jenny - Karen Dotrice
 Virginia - Sarah Badel
 Acorn - Philip Locke
 Father Below - Richard Pearson
 Lafone - Freda Jackson
 Bell - Ralph Arliss
 Carson - Bernard Hill
 Candle - Simon Cadell
 Gaston - Jonathan Lynn
 Jean - Pat Gorman
 Luis - Derek Deadman
 Marc - Anthony Scott

Credits

 Music composed by: John Cameron
 Film Editor: Chris Lovett
 Photography: Brian Tufano
 Script Editor: Richard Broke
 Designer: Tony Abbott
 Producer: Mark Shivas
 Director: Clive Donner

References

External links
She Fell Among Thieves at IMDb

British television films
Films directed by Clive Donner